Michael Danso Agyemang (born 27 May 2001) is a Ghanaian footballer who currently plays as a midfielder for Ghana Premier League side WAFA.

Career 
Agyemang started his career with West African Football Academy after passing a trials in 2018. He was promoted to the senior team in August 2018. On 10 April 2019, he made his debut during the 2019 GFA Normalization Committee Competition, in a 2–1 victory over Karela United. At the end of the competition he made 7 league appearances. During the truncated 2019–20 season, he made 9 league appearances before the league was cancelled due to the COVID-19 pandemic in Ghana. He was named on the club's squad list for the 2020–21 season of which he made 10 league appearances.

References

External links 
 

2001 births
Living people
Association football midfielders
Ghanaian footballers
West African Football Academy players
Ghana Premier League players